"Travelling Man" is the second single by Irish trio the Original Rudeboys from the album This Life. The song was released as a single on 9 March 2012 on an EP, through Gotta Run Records.

Track listing
 Travelling Man EP
 "Travelling Man" (Radio version) - 3:27
 "Travelling Man" (A to B Remix) - 4:39
 "Feel the Same" - 3:16
 "The Last Goodbye" - 2:43

Chart

References

2012 singles